Trojan script is a series of signs of unknown origin found on vessels from Troy excavated by Heinrich Schliemann's expedition. Their status is disputed.

Analysis 
A Soviet historian of antiquity  found them much similar to Linear B signs, while another Soviet historian, regarded them as "imitation of writing".

Inscriptions 
Inscription № 2444, if compared with Linear B (or Linear A) signs, may be read:

Inscription № 2445 is illegible and seems to have partly deteriorated; several signs may be identified as fragments of Linear A or Linear B signs but not as whole signs.

See also
Cypro-Minoan syllabary
Trojan language
Teucer
Undeciphered writing systems

References

Sources 

  (Includes images of inscriptions 2444 and 2445.)
 

Hellenic scripts
Bronze Age writing systems
Undeciphered writing systems
Troad